Fool's Mate is a 1956 short film directed by Jacques Rivette.

It stars Virginie Vitry as a wife cheating on her husband (Jacques Doniol-Valcroze).  When her lover (Jean-Claude Brialy) buys her a mink coat, the adulterous pair hatch a plan to avoid her husband's questioning the coat's origins.

Fool's Mate is considered by some to be the first film of the French New Wave, or the movement's earliest antecedent. Released in 1956, the film is something of a curio thanks to a scene in which Rivette and New Wave contemporaries Claude Chabrol, Jean-Luc Godard, and François Truffaut are seen in the same room as party guests.

References

External links
 
 

1956 films
Films directed by Jacques Rivette
French short films
1956 short films
1950s French-language films
1950s French films
French romantic comedy films
1956 romantic comedy films
French black-and-white films